Kalamasseriyil Kalyanayogam is a 1995 Indian Malayalam film, directed by Balu Kiriyath, starring Mukesh and Charmila in the lead roles.

Cast

 Mukesh as Balachandran
 Charmila as Ashwathy Nair
 Premkumar as Prakashan
 Narendra Prasad as KodalipparampilSankara Menon
 Janardanan as Kalamassery Krishnan nair
 Indrans as Palarivattom Philippose
 Kalpana as Chembakassery Shakuntala
 Rajan P Dev as Edappally Raman Nair
Rizabawa as  Edappally Anantharaman
Kanakalatha as Soudamini
K. R. Vatsala as Ambika
Zainuddin as Gundu Vasu 
Satheesh as Chembakassery Chandrappan
KTS Padannayil
Kalabhavan Navas as Navas
Shaju
Kalabhavan Haneef
Nikhil
Bindu Varapuzha as Mariyamma
Usha TT as Hostelwarden Annakutty
Ragini as Mrs Thara Umesh
Rani Larius as Balachandran's sister

References

External links

1995 films
1990s Malayalam-language films